Heinz Hauser (born 23 December 1920 in Waltersdorf – 22 November 1996)
) was a West German Nordic skier who competed in the 1950s. He finished 15th in the Nordic combined event and 54th in the 18 km cross-country skiing event at the 1952 Winter Olympics in Oslo. Hauser was also four time national champion in the Nordic combined event (1952–1954, 1956). Hauser also competed in the 1956 Winter Olympics as well. He died in Reit im Winkl.

References 
 18 km Olympic cross-country results: 1948–52
 German champions in Nordic combined and ski jumping: 1900–2003. 
 Olympic Nordic combined results: 1948–64

External links
  

Olympic cross-country skiers of Germany
Olympic cross-country skiers of the United Team of Germany
Olympic Nordic combined skiers of Germany
Olympic Nordic combined skiers of the United Team of Germany
Cross-country skiers at the 1952 Winter Olympics
Cross-country skiers at the 1956 Winter Olympics
Nordic combined skiers at the 1952 Winter Olympics
Nordic combined skiers at the 1956 Winter Olympics
German male cross-country skiers
German male Nordic combined skiers
German male ski jumpers
1920 births
1996 deaths
People from Görlitz (district)
Sportspeople from Saxony